Ibrahim Al-Sallal (Arabic: إبراهيم الصلال; born March 15, 1940), Kuwaiti actor.

Works

Movies 
Al Samt (1976)
Al Miraya (1984)
Gamal Abdel Nasser (1998)

References

1940 births
Living people
Kuwaiti male actors
Kuwaiti male stage actors
Kuwaiti male film actors
20th-century Kuwaiti male actors
21st-century Kuwaiti male actors